The 2015 Brunei Super League is the third season of the Brunei Super League. It is organized by the National Football Association of Brunei Darussalam and sponsored by DST Group.

On 23 October 2015, MS ABDB clinched the title with two games left to play. A 6–1 victory over Kilanas FC had put them 13 points ahead of second-placed Indera SC, guaranteeing the Armymen's first league title since 1985.

On 25 October 2015, the match between Tabuan Muda and Indera SC was initially ruled as a 3-0 walkover to Tabuan Muda after a third sending-off of an Indera player. However, this was against tournament rules (based on the Laws of the Game) which ruled that a match cannot continue with seven players in a team, and the referee of that match was deemed to have made an error of judgment. The match was scheduled to be replayed on 22 November, but this time Tabuan Muda did not field enough players for the match and thus resulted in a 3-0 walkover to Indera SC. Tabuan Muda were retrospectively fined BND$500 for their no-show in a statement by NFABD on 9 April 2016.

Teams
 Indera SC
 MS ABDB (Royal Brunei Armed Forces SC)
 Najip I-Team
 MS PDB (Royal Brunei Police Forces SC)
 Wijaya FC 
 Jerudong FC
 Kilanas FC
 Lun Bawang
 IKLS FC 
 Tabuan Muda (Brunei U23)

Stadiums and locations

Foreign Players

League standings

Top scorers

References

External links
Official website, nfabd.org
Brunei 2015, RSSSF.com
DST Group Brunei Premier League, FIFA.com

Brunei Super League seasons
Brunei
Brunei
1